Shawn McPherson (born July 5, 1965) is an American politician and businessman serving as a member of the Kentucky House of Representatives from the 22nd district. Elected in November 2020, he assumed office on January 1, 2021.

Early life and education 
McPherson was born in Tompkinsville, Kentucky in 1965. He earned a Bachelor of Science degree in agricultural business from Western Kentucky University in 1987 and a Master of Science in animal nutrition from WKU in 1991.

Career 
From 1989 to 1995, McPherson served as an appraiser for the Kentucky Transportation Cabinet. He also worked for the Kentucky Highway Department. In 1995, he founded McPherson Appraisal Service. He has also worked as the CEO of Highland Ridge Assisted Living, CFO of Companion Care Services, and CFO of Palmer Place Assisted Living. McPherson was elected to the Kentucky House of Representatives in November 2020 and assumed office on January 1, 2021.

Personal life 
McPherson and his wife, Susan, have four children. He is a member of the Scottsville Church of Christ.

References 

Living people
1965 births
People from Tompkinsville, Kentucky
Republican Party members of the Kentucky House of Representatives
Western Kentucky University alumni
21st-century American politicians